The 1975 Los Angeles Rams season was the team's 38th year with the National Football League, and the 30th season in Los Angeles.

In 2007, ESPN.com ranked the 1975 Rams as the tenth-greatest defense in NFL history. Said ESPN.com, "Fred Dryer. Jack Youngblood. Merlin Olsen. Get the idea? They weren't the "Fearsome Foursome," but with those guys anchoring the defensive line, and All-Pros Isiah Robertson (linebacker) and Dave Elmendorf (safety), the Rams were almost impossible to score against. The Rams went 12–2, holding opponents to just 9.6 points a game, (the second-lowest average in NFL history) and ending the season with a six-game winning streak during which they gave up just 32 points. The defense wasn't as impressive in the postseason, surrendering 23 points in a first-round 35–23 victory over the offensive powerhouse Cardinals before being demolished  37–7 by the Cowboys in the NFC title game."

Offseason

NFL Draft

Roster

Regular season

Schedule

Week 1: Dallas Cowboys

Playoffs

NFC Divisional Playoff

NFC Championship Game

Standings

References

External links 
 1975 Los Angeles Rams season at Pro-Football Reference

Los Angeles Rams
Los Angeles Rams seasons
NFC West championship seasons
Los Angeles Rams